Family policy may refer to:

 Family policy in Hungary
 Family policy in Japan
 Family policy in Iceland
 Family policy in Ireland
 Family policy in the Netherlands
 Family policy in Spain
 Family policy in the United Kingdom